Cathepsin G is a protein that in humans is encoded by the CTSG gene. It is one of the three serine proteases of the chymotrypsin family that are stored in the azurophil granules, and also a member of the peptidase S1 protein family. Cathepsin G plays an important role in eliminating intracellular pathogens and breaking down tissues at inflammatory sites, as well as in anti-inflammatory response.

Structure

Gene
The CTSG gene is located at chromosome 14q11.2, consisting of 5 exons. Each residue of the catalytic triad is located on a separate exon. Five polymorphisms have been identified by scanning the entire coding region. Cathepsin G is one of those homologous protease that evolved from a common ancestor by gene duplication.

Protein
Cathepsin G is a 255-amino-acid-residue protein including an 18-residue signal peptide, a two-residue activation peptide at the N-terminus and a carboxy terminal extension. The activity of cathepsin G depends on a catalytic triad composed of aspartate, histidine and serine residues which are widely separated in the primary sequence but close to each other at the active site of the enzyme in the tertiary structure.

Function 

Cathepsin G has a specificity similar to that of chymotrypsin C, but it is most closely related to other immune serine proteases, such as neutrophil elastase and the granzymes. As a neutrophil serine protease, was first identified as degradative enzyme that acts intracellularly to degrade ingested host pathogens and extracellularly in the breakdown of ECM components at inflammatory sites. It localizes to Neutrophil extracellular traps (NETs), via its high affinity for DNA, an unusual property for serine proteases. Transcript variants utilizing alternative polyadenylation signals exist for this gene. Cathepsin G was also found to exert broad-spectrum antibacterial action against Gram-negative and –positive bacteria independent of the function mentioned above. Other functions of cathepsin G have been reported, including cleavage of receptors, conversion of angiotensin I to angiotensin II, platelet activation, and induction of airway submucosal gland secretion. Potential implications of the enzyme in blood-brain barrier breakdown was also found.

Clinical significance 

Cathepsin G has been reported to play an important role in a variety of diseases, including rheumatoid arthritis, coronary artery disease, periodontitis, ischemic reperfusion injury, and bone metastasis. It is also implicated in a variety of infectious inflammatory diseases, including chronic obstructive pulmonary disease, acute respiratory distress syndrome, and cystic fibrosis. A recent study shows that patients with CTSG gene polymorphisms have higher risk of chronic postsurgical pain, suggesting cathepsin G may serve as a novel target for pain control and a potential marker to predict chronic postsurgical pain. An upregulation of cathepsin G was reported in studies of keratoconus.

Interactions 

Cathepsin G has been found to interact  with:
 SERPINB1
Cathepsin G is inhibited by:
  [2-[3-[[(1-benzoyl-4-piperidinyl)methylamino]carbonyl]-2-naphthalenyl]-1-(1-naphthalenyl)-2-oxoethyl]-phosphonic acid (KPA) 
 Caesalpinia echinata elastase inhibitor
 N-Arylacyl O-sulfonated aminoglycosides
Cathepsin G lowers levels of:
 Low-density lipoprotein

See also 
Cathepsins

References

Further reading

External links 
 The MEROPS online database for peptidases and their inhibitors: S01.133

Proteases
EC 3.4.21
Extracellular matrix remodeling enzymes
Cathepsins